KIXN (102.9 FM) is a radio station broadcasting a Country music format. Licensed to Hobbs, New Mexico, United States, the station is currently owned by Noalmark Broadcasting Corporation.

Engineering
Chief Engineer is Kenneth S. Fine, CPBE

References

External links
 

Country radio stations in the United States
IXN
Noalmark Broadcasting Corporation radio stations